Liang Jie (born 11February 1975) is a Chinese technology executive and entrepreneur. He is currently the Chief Technology Officer of UCWeb Inc., a Chinese mobile Internet and software company he co-founded in 2004. UCWeb was acquired by Alibaba Group in June 2014 in the largest Chinese Internet merger deal ever. He is also the president of Shenma Inc., a joint venture formed by UCWeb and Alibaba that offers a mobile-centric search service.

Biography 
A Guangzhou native, Liang attended the city's South China University of Technology and graduated with a bachelor's degree in Computer Science in 1998. After graduation, he started his career at Asiainfo Technologies' Guangzhou office in role of software engineer working on large scale email system.

In 2004, he co-founded UCWeb with He Xiaopeng, overseeing the company's R&D and technology innovation-related affairs. He led the company's tech team to build a proprietary mobile browser rendering engine U3 kernel.

He is also an investor in 3 startups incubated in the New Delhi-based Venture Gurukool.

Prizes 
 Zhou Guangzhao Foundation Science & Technology Fund Innovation Award

References

Businesspeople from Guangzhou
1975 births
Living people
Chinese chief technology officers
South China University of Technology alumni
Alibaba Group people